The County Hall is a 17-storey office block, owned by Cork County Council and housing its administrative headquarters. The building is located on Carrigrohane Road in the City of Cork. Although the building is owned by Cork County Council, it is located in a separate administrative area from the County - Cork City. However, it has since been surpassed by three other buildings. It is now a protected building.

History
Originally meetings of Cork County Council had been held in the back portion of the top floor of Cork Courthouse. By the 1950s these premises were becoming inadequate and work on a new purpose-built building, designed by Patrick McSweeney, the then Cork County Architect, started in 1965. It was officially opened in April 1968. Oisín Kelly's statue, Two Working Men, stands outside the complex.

Redevelopment
A redevelopment project began in 2002 to re-clad the existing building, add a new storey to the tower block and build a six-storey extension to the side of the tower.  The original distinctive concrete facade had been severely eroded and it was decided to replace rather than repair this as part of an expansion scheme. A louvered glass cladding replaced the original concrete, and the six-storey extension at ground level was completed in June 2006, as well as a new concourse and council chamber. The redevelopment cost €50 million.

References

External links
 Cork County Hall - Council website

Buildings and structures in Cork (city)
Skyscraper office buildings in the Republic of Ireland
Government buildings completed in 1968
Cork
Office buildings in the Republic of Ireland
Skyscrapers in the Republic of Ireland
20th-century architecture in the Republic of Ireland